Cocktion is a dessert in Jamaican cuisine made from parched corn and sugar rolled into balls and sometimes colored.

See also
 List of Jamaican dishes

References

Jamaican cuisine
Maize dishes
Desserts